

LeConte Stewart (April 15, 1891 – June 6, 1990) was a Latter-day Saint artist primarily known for his landscapes of rural Utah. His media included oils, watercolors, pastel and charcoal, as well as etchings, linocuts, and lithographs. His home/studio in Kaysville, Utah is on the National Register of Historic Places.

Personal life

Stewart was born in Glenwood, Utah. His art education began in 1912, at the University of Utah, and included studies at the Art Students League summer school at Woodstock, New York, and the Pennsylvania Academy of the Fine Arts in Chester Springs. 

In 1917 Stewart went to Hawai'i as a missionary for the Church of Jesus Christ of Latter-day Saints. After being there about 3 weeks he was given the assignment to create internal murals for the various endowment rooms of the Laie Hawaii Temple. This had already been done by Lewis A. Ramsey a few months before. However Ramsey's murals had been placed directly on the walls and were already deteriorating due to high levels of moisture. Besides creating murals Stewart also oversaw the general decorative work of the temple, overseeing the choice of and placement of furniture, carpets and drapes.

While he was in Hawai'i Stewart's fiancee Zipporah Layton traveled there from Utah. They were married and Mrs. Stewart began to serve as a teacher at the school the church ran in La'ie while Stewart continued to oversee the artistic and decorative work for the temple.

Stewart became the head of the Art Department at the University of Utah in 1938, and held that post until his retirement in 1956. Stewart died in Kaysville, Utah at the age of 99. He was survived by his son, Maynard Dixon Stewart, an artist and much-beloved and respected art instructor (now retired) at San Jose State University.

Work
Stewart is best known for his unidealized landscapes of rural Utah, spawning the term "LeConte Stewart Country." Stewart is quoted as saying, "It is not that I love the lyrical in nature the less, but I feel that in modern life there is no time, no inclination for it. In these pictures I'm trying to cut a slice of contemporary life as it is in the highways and biways as I have found it." Some of Stewart's paintings have a photographic quality from a distance but are actually formed with broad strokes and a thick palette.

Much of his work uses direct impressionistic techniques to convey the meaning of what he saw around him, illustrating things "...that are introspective, that you peer into, that you understand and feel." Stewart stated: "Impressionism is the most important painting innovation of all time....I thought to myself, why not use this technique to express an idea rather than making it the end goal of a painting? I have tried to think of it as a means of interpreting landscaping rather than making it merely impressionistic."

Stewart described himself as having an urgency in his work. A plaque in the Kaysville Gallery of Art reads: "I had a great urgency to work as rapidly as possible. Each Saturday I painted one large 24-by-30-inch picture in the morning and another in the afternoon. Between I painted four smaller studies. Six was an average Saturday for me."

In addition to landscapes, Stewart also did portraiture and murals. He painted several murals for the Church of Jesus Christ of Latter-day Saints (LDS Church) buildings, including works found inside the LDS temples in Hawaii, Alberta, and Arizona, as well as murals for the Salt Lake City International Airport and the historic Bigelow-Ben Lomond Hotel.

Legacy
In 1985, the LDS Church published a collectors item titled LeConte Stewart: The spirit of landscape by Robert Davis, which documented some of his works. 7 November 2002 was declared as "LeConte Stewart Day" in Utah by then Governor Mike Leavitt.

The largest public exhibition of LeConte Stewart's work to date began in Salt Lake City on 21 July 2011 and continued until 15 January 2012. It was jointly hosted by the Utah Museum of Fine Arts and the LDS Church History Museum, with concurrent shows at those museum's individual locations. It was the first collaboration of this kind for those institutions, each of which holds a significant amount of fine art by Utah artists.

See also 
 Mormon art
 National Register of Historic Places listings in Davis County, Utah
 Springville Museum of Art

Notes

References 

 LeConte Stewart, Church History Department, LDS Church 
 LeConte Stewart: About the Artist, Utah Museum of Fine Arts
 LeConte Stewart article at the Springville Museum of Art website
 LeConte LeConte Stewart, a biography by the Utah Artists Project, University of Utah

Further reading

External links
 LeConte Stewart: Depression Era Art, Utah Museum of Fine Arts (UMFA) - one of the two web based companions to the joint UMFA-Church History Museum exhibitions from 21 July 2011 - 15 January 2012
 LeConte Stewart: The Soul of Rural Utah, Church History Museum, LDS Church - second web based companion to the joint UMFA-Church History Museum exhibitions from 21 July 2011 - 15 January 2012
 The LeConte Stewart Papers held at the J. Willard Marriott Library, University of Utah
 Kaysville Gallery of Art, LeConte Stewart Collection is part of the library in the old city hall building. 
 —Some examples of Stewart's work
 A few more examples of his work from Christian Nielsen
 Self Portrait located in the Church History Museum of the LDS Church
 Photo of Stewart later in life from the Utah State Historical Society
 LeConte Stewart - a 2nd grade lesson plan about local Kaysville heritage
 Works from the Permanent Collection of the Utah Museum of Fine Arts

1891 births
1990 deaths
American Latter Day Saints
Artists from Utah
Latter Day Saint artists
Pennsylvania Academy of the Fine Arts alumni
People from Glenwood, Utah
People from Kaysville, Utah
University of Utah alumni
University of Utah faculty